Gilles de Souvré, Marquis de Courtanvaux, Baron de Lezines (c. 1540 – 1626), marshal of France, belonged to an old family of the Perche.

He accompanied the duke of Anjou to Poland in 1573, and was appointed master of the wardrobe and captain of Vincennes when Anjou became Henry III. He remained in favour, despite the opposition of the queen mother, Catherine de' Medici, fought at Contras, defended Tours against the Leaguers, was named chévalier de Saint Esprit and governor of Touraine (1585), and was one of the first to recognize Henry IV (1589), who subsequently entrusted him with the education of the dauphin. Louis XIII rewarded him with the title of marshal in 1613. He died in Paris in 1626.

References

Courtanvaux
Courtanvaux
Souvré, Gilles de
Souvré, Gilles de
Souvré, Gilles de